Television Playhouse is a half-hour American anthology series that was broadcast  live on NBC. The series aired from December 4, 1947 to April 11, 1948, generally appearing every third Sunday during its run. The program was in cooperation with the National Theater and Academy, a federally sponsored  theater group, and featured live performances of plays, some of which were by well-known authors.

The first presentation was The Last of My Solid Gold Watches by Tennessee Williams.  Each episode featured actors and actresses who had not reached stardom.  A wide variety of plays was presented on the program. Although short-lived, the "live play" format later became very popular during the early 1950s.

Another Television Playhouse would air in the 1950s (see Philco Television Playhouse and Goodyear Television Playhouse).

See also
1947-48 United States network television schedule

References

External links
 

1940s American anthology television series
1947 American television series debuts
1948 American television series endings
NBC original programming
American live television series
1940s American drama television series
Black-and-white American television shows
English-language television shows